The Pollachi district is a proposed district from Coimbatore district of Tamil Nadu, India.
According to the 2011 Census of India, the estimated area of Pollachi Division is 2,089 sq. km.The Pollachi division has four taluks: Pollachi, Anaimalai, Kinathukadavu and Valparai.

According to 2011 census, the estimated population of the Pollachi Division is 6,57,876. Edapadi k.palanisamy has declared three districts to be formed in 2020-2021. They are Pollachi, Gobichettipalayam and Kumbakonam.

The new Pollachi District will be formed by the Pollachi, Anaimalai, Kinathukadavu and Valparai talukas of the Coimbatore District and Udumalaipettai and Madathukulam talukas of the Tiruppur District.  The estimated area is 3,738 sq. km and population (as per 2011 census) is 10,32,946.

References 
 

Coimbatore district